Stereodermus exilis is a species of primitive weevil in the beetle family Brentidae. It is found in the Caribbean Sea and North America.

References

Further reading

 
 
 
 

Brentidae
Articles created by Qbugbot
Beetles described in 1870